is a passenger railway station located in the city of Iyo, Ehime Prefecture, Japan. It is operated by the private transportation company Iyotetsu.

Lines
During most of the day, trains arrive every fifteen minutes.

History
The station was opened on July 4,1896

Surrounding area
 Iyo City Hall

See also
 List of railway stations in Japan

References

External links

Iyotetsu Gunchū Line
Railway stations in Ehime Prefecture
Railway stations in Japan opened in 1896
Iyo, Ehime